The Day of the Dog is a novel written by George Barr McCutcheon in 1904.

External links 
 

1904 American novels
Novels by George Barr McCutcheon